Wolverine Hill  was a ski jumping hill located in Ironwood, Michigan, United States.

History
Owned by the Gogebic Range Ski Club, it had a K-point at 60 meters. Torger Tokle, the Norwegian immigrant to the US in 1939, set the hill record of 66 m (216 ft.) in 1942.  The record would last through the life of the original hill.

First built in 1935 and hosted competitions every winter---except for the World War II years---and remained in use until 1963, when it was demolished in a storm.  The facilities were rebuilt in 1975 and hosted the USA Ski team for practice in November 1975. Steve Sydow of Duluth set a new hill record of 68 m (223 ft.) in 1983. The Wolverine Hill was in operation until 1995 when declining numbers of competitors forced its closing.

See Also
Curry Hill (Ironwood)
Copper Peak

References

External links
Wolverine Hill skisprungschanzen.com

Defunct sports venues in Michigan
Ski jumping venues in Michigan